Stanislav Eduardovich Khan (born 1 July 1987) is a former Russian professional footballer.

Club career
He made his Russian Football National League debut for FC Sokol Saratov on 15 August 2004 in a game against FC SKA-Energiya Khabarovsk. He played two more seasons in the FNL for Sokol and FC Dynamo Makhachkala.

External links
 

1987 births
Sportspeople from Tashkent
Living people
Russian footballers
Association football midfielders
FC Chernomorets Novorossiysk players
FC Sokol Saratov players
Dinaburg FC players
FC Armavir players
FC Spartak Kostroma players
Latvian Higher League players
Russian expatriate footballers
Expatriate footballers in Latvia
Russian expatriate sportspeople in Latvia
FC Mashuk-KMV Pyatigorsk players
FC Dynamo Makhachkala players
FC Dynamo Kirov players